Akaho (written: 赤穂, 赤保 and 明穂) is a Japanese surname. Notable people with the surname include:

, Japanese women's basketball player
, Japanese basketball player
, Japanese women's basketball player

Japanese-language surnames